Lectionary 330 (Gregory-Aland), designated by siglum ℓ 330 (in the Gregory-Aland numbering) is a Greek manuscript of the New Testament, on parchment. Palaeographically it has been assigned to the 12th century. The manuscript has not survived in complete condition.

Description 

The original codex contained lessons from the Gospel of John, Matthew, and Luke (Evangelistarium), with lacunae (40 leaves were lost) on 306 parchment leaves. The leaves are measured.

The text is written in Greek minuscule letters, in two columns per page, 21 lines per page.

The codex contains weekday Gospel lessons from Easter to Pentecost and Saturday/Sunday Gospel lessons for the other weeks.

History 
According to the colophon it was written in 1185. It has been assigned by the Institute for New Testament Textual Research (INTF) to the 12th century.

It was written by a monk named Cosmas for one Basilius.

It was purchased from Ivor B. Guest in 1871 (along with lectionary 331). It was examined and described by Oscar von Gebhardt in 1881.

The manuscript was added to the list of New Testament manuscripts by Frederick Henry Ambrose Scrivener (279e) and Caspar René Gregory (number 330e). Gregory saw it in 1883.

The codex is housed at the British Library (Add MS 28817) in London.

The fragment is not cited in critical editions of the Greek New Testament (UBS4, NA28).

See also 

 List of New Testament lectionaries
 Biblical manuscript
 Textual criticism
 Lectionary 329

Notes and references

Bibliography 

 

Greek New Testament lectionaries
12th-century biblical manuscripts
British Library additional manuscripts